Elhadjy Madior N'Diaye (born 20 May 1983) is a Senegalese former footballer who played mainly as a right back.

Club career
Born in Saint-Louis, N'Diaye arrived in Portugal in 2005, signing with Vitória de Setúbal from AS Douanes. He appeared rarely for the Sado side during his two-year spell, inclusively being demoted to the reserves.

After one year without a club, N'Diaye resumed his career in the same country, representing S.C.U. Torreense (third division) and F.C. Famalicão (fourth tier). He then spent a few months with Portimonense S.C. without making one single official appearance, following which he joined amateurs C.F. Fão in Esposende.

References

External links

1983 births
Living people
Sportspeople from Saint-Louis, Senegal
Senegalese footballers
Association football defenders
AS Douanes (Senegal) players
Primeira Liga players
Segunda Divisão players
Vitória F.C. players
S.C.U. Torreense players
F.C. Famalicão players
Portimonense S.C. players
C.F. Fão players
SC Mirandela players
SC Vianense players
Senegalese expatriate footballers
Expatriate footballers in Portugal
Expatriate footballers in Switzerland
Senegalese expatriate sportspeople in Portugal
Senegalese expatriate sportspeople in Switzerland